The 1998 Primera B de Chile was the 48th completed season of the Primera B de Chile.

Cobresal was tournament’s champion and was promoted to 1999 Primera División de Chile alongside O'Higgins and Santiago Morning, which achieved the promotion in the Promotion Playoffs.

League table

Promotion/relegation play-offs

References

External links
 RSSSF 1998

Primera B de Chile seasons
Primera B
Chil